Fabrice Lig, also known as Soul Designer (born Fabrice Ligny; 1972 in Charleroi, Belgium), is a techno music producer.

External links 
The official Fabrice Lig site
Fabrice Lig discography at Discogs.com
Standard² Performance, at Air Tokyo
RBMA Radio On Demand - Train Wreck Mix - Fabrice Lig (Melodika, F-Communications)

1972 births
Belgian musicians
Living people
Techno musicians
21st-century Belgian musicians